The FC Basel 1897–98 season was their fifth season since the club's foundation on 15 November 1893. The club's chairman was Charlie Volderauer and he was chairman between 1896 and 1900. He was the third chairman in the club's history, following Roland Geldner (1893–1896) and Emanuel Schiess (1896). FC Basel played their home games in the Landhof, in the Wettstein neighborhood of Kleinbasel (lesser Basel). The official Swiss championship had not yet been called to into life. Although this season a first, unofficial, competition was played, Basel did not compete.

Overview 
Although the first national championship in Switzerland took place in 1897–98 it is considered as unofficial because it was not organized by the Swiss Football Association (SFA; founded in 1895). FC Basel did not participate in this first championship, neither did local rivals Old Boys.

From a local point of view, there were also following clubs from Basel who played football. FC Play Fellows were founded in 1895, FC Excelsior founded 1896 and FC Kleinbasel founded at the beginning of 1898. The football team Buckjumpers-Club, founded 1894, dispanded themselves during 1897 and most players moved to FC Basel who then fielded a reserve team. FC Gymnasia, who were founded 1884 by Gymniasasten and real high school students was also dissolved. The RTV/Realschüler-Turnverein (real school student gymnastics club) had a football team from 1893 to 1898 from which the FC Old Boys emerged in 1894.

For this season FC Basel organised 10 friendly matches for their first team. Five were played at home in the Landhof and all five were won. Two friendlies were played in Zürich and both ended in high scoring defeats, 3–7 against Zürich and 0–7 against Grasshopper Club. The return game against local club Old Boys was drawn and the return game against Biel-Bienne was won 5–2. The friendly match against FC Bern was played on neutral ground in Aarau and Basel won this game 4–1. Of their 10 games Basel won seven, drew once and were defeated twice. The team scored 29 and conceded 20 goals. Much documentation for this season's matches are incomplete, therefore most goal scorers remain unknown.

Players

Results

Legend

Friendly matches

Autumn

Spring

See also 
 History of FC Basel
 List of FC Basel players
 List of FC Basel seasons

References

Sources 
 Rotblau: Jahrbuch Saison 2014/2015. Publisher: FC Basel Marketing AG. 
 Die ersten 125 Jahre. Publisher: Josef Zindel im Friedrich Reinhardt Verlag, Basel. 
 FCB squad 1897-1898 at fcb-archiv.ch
''(NB: Despite all efforts, the editors of these books and the authors in "Basler Fussballarchiv" have failed to be able to identify all the players, their date and place of birth or date and place of death, who played in the games during the early years of FC Basel.)

External links 
 FC Basel official site

FC Basel seasons
Basel